Volvo EC (“Volvo Electric Car”) was a concept car, which was built by Volvo sometime in 1977. It was only a two seater, but with good cargo space. It never entered production, perhaps because it needed ten hours of charging, for only two hours of driving.

EC